Välkommen Hero is a 1986 studio album by Freda', released on vinyl, cassette tape. and CD. In 1993, the album was rerelased to CD.

Track listing 
Lyrics and music: Uno Svenningsson & Arne Johansson.

 Ingen kan förklara
 En dag till
 Välkommen Hero
 Ljusa sidan
 Vi formas och vi lär
 Doktorn
 Vindarna
 Ännu en svala
 Somnar in
 Drömmen är min
1993 CD edition bonus tracks (1993):
 Sanningens magi
 På tiden att vi träffas
 Ta min plats

Contributors (Freda') 
Uno Svenningsson - vocals, guitar, choir
Arne Johansson - guitar, synthesizer, programming, choir
Sam Johansson - synth, organ, choir
Mats Johansson - drums, percussion and synthesizer

Other musicians 
Dan Sundquist - programming, synthesizer, choir
Lars Danielsson - electric bass, double bass (1, 2, 3 and 8)
Jerry Walfridsson - bass (4, 5 and 6)
Per Nordbring - drums (7 and 10)
Jan Nordbring - bass (7 and 10)

Charts

References 

1986 albums
Freda' albums
Swedish-language albums